Ove Andersen (born 30 June 1937) is a Danish former footballer who played as a forward for Brønshøj Boldklub. He made 12 appearances for the Denmark national team from 1956 to 1963.

References

External links
 

1937 births
Living people
Danish men's footballers
Footballers from Copenhagen
Association football forwards
Denmark international footballers
Denmark youth international footballers
Denmark under-21 international footballers
Brønshøj Boldklub players